Hakan Günday (born 29 May 1976) is a Turkish writer. He was born on the island of Rhodes in 1976. He lived in Brussels as a boy, before moving to Ankara where he completed high school. He studied in Hacettepe University, Université Libre de Bruxelles and Ankara University.

His first novel Kinyas ve Kayra came out in 2000. Notable works include Loss (Ziyan), which won the Prix France-Turquie, and More (Daha) which won the Prix Médicis étranger.

Günday lives and works in Istanbul.

Works
 Van’mourn and Chaira (Kinyas ve Kayra), 2000, novel
 Garfish (Zargana), 2002, novel 
 Bastard (Piç), 2003, novel
 A Cautionary Tale (Malafa), 2005, novel 
 Dismissal (Azil), 2007, novel
 Loss (Ziyan), 2009, novel 2014 Prix France-Turquie 
 The Few (AZ), 2011, novel 2011 Best Novel in Turkey
 More (Daha), 2013, novel, 2015 Le Prix Médicis étranger
 Pronoun (Zamir), 2021, novel

References

Turkish novelists
Prix Médicis étranger winners
Writers from Istanbul
Hacettepe University alumni
Université libre de Bruxelles alumni
Ankara University alumni
1976 births
Living people